USS St. Joseph's River (LSM(R)-527) was laid down on 19 May 1945 by the Brown Shipbuilding Co., Inc., in Houston, Texas; she was launched on 16 June 1945 and commissioned on 24 August 1945.

Service history
Active for less than three months, LSM(R)-527 joined the 16th (Inactive) Fleet in November 1945; decommissioned on 28 March 1946, she remained berthed for the next four years at Green Cove Springs, Florida. In June 1950, however, the North Korean Army pushed south across the 38th Parallel. LSM(R)-527 was recommissioned on 14 October.

Korean war
From mid-November 1950 until mid-March 1951, LSM(R)-527 trained out of Little Creek, Virginia, then headed for California and duty with the Pacific Fleet. Assigned to Landing Ship Squadron 3, she arrived in San Diego on 12 April. Through the summer, she conducted exercises off the southern California coast. In the fall, she underwent overhaul at Mare Island Navy Yard; and with the winter of 1951-52, she resumed operations off southern California. In March and April 1952, she operated off the Panama Canal Zone. In May, she headed west for duty off Korea.

LSM(R)-527 arrived at Yokosuka on 19 June. Ten days later, she was en route to operating area "Nan" off the west coast of the embattled Korean peninsula. From 3 to 15 July and again from 16 August to 3 September, she helped to defend the islands held by United Nations forces, particularly Cho-Do and Sok-To in the approaches to the Taedong estuary.

Returning to Japan after each tour, she sailed for the Korean east coast from Sasebo Naval base on 10 October. In TU 76.42.1, she conducted exercises off Kangmung. On 15 October, she arrived off Kojo to provide shore bombardment support for the amphibious feint staged there on that date. By 18 October, she was back in Sasebo. Exercises in Japanese waters followed, and on 14 November, she returned to area "Nan." Through December, she continued to operate off Cho-Do and Sok-To. After fire support activities in early January 1953, she shifted to Taechong-Do. She returned to Yokosuka on 25 January; she sailed for California on 24 February.

Steaming via Midway Atoll and Pearl Harbor, LSM(R)-527 arrived in San Diego on 23 March and remained on the west coast until 10 February 1954. She then headed west again. In the western Pacific from mid-March to mid-October, she participated in exercises in Japanese, Korean, and Okinawan waters and in the Volcano Islands area and carried cargo between Japanese and Korean ports.

On 7 November, LSM(R)-527 returned to San Diego. Two months later, in January 1955, she entered the Mare Island Naval Shipyard to prepare for inactivation. In April, she joined the Pacific Reserve Fleet. On 5 August, she was decommissioned and berthed with the San Diego Group. She was renamed St. Joseph's River on 1 October (for the St. Josephs River in northeast Indiana).

LSM(R)-527 earned two battle stars during the Korean War.

ROKS Si Hung
The USS St. Joseph's River remained berthed at San Diego until activated in the summer of 1960, when she was transferred to the Republic of Korea Navy and commissioned as ROKS Si Hung (LFR-311).

References

External links
  navsource.org: USS St. Joseph's River

 

Ships built in Houston
World War II amphibious warfare vessels of the United States
Korean War amphibious warfare vessels of the United States
Ships transferred from the United States Navy to the Republic of Korea Navy
LSM(R)-501-class medium landing ships
1945 ships